William Frullani (born 21 September 1979 in Prato) is a decathlete and bobsleigh competitor from Italy.

Biography
Frullani won two medals, one of these at senior level, at the International athletics competitions. He set his personal best score (7984 points) in the men's decathlon at the 2002 Hypo-Meeting in Götzis. In 2009 he finished 6th at the European Indoor Championships in Turin in the heptathlon with a national record of 5972 points.

He was married to his combined events fellow, the Ukrainian heptathlete Hanna Melnychenko.

Achievements

National titles
He has won 5 times the individual national championship.
4 wins in the decathlon (2001, 2006, 2010, 2012)
1 win in the heptathlon indoor (2009)

Bobsleigh
Frullani switched to bobsleigh in 2012. He tested positive for methylhexanamine at the 2014 Winter Olympics and was excluded from the Italian team. He was replaced by Samuele Romanini.

See also
Italian all-time top lists - Decathlon

References

External links
 

1979 births
Living people
Italian decathletes
Italian male bobsledders
Athletics competitors of Centro Sportivo Carabinieri
People from Prato
Doping cases in bobsleigh
Italian sportspeople in doping cases
Bobsledders of Centro Sportivo Carabinieri
Sportspeople from the Province of Prato